Pulai Hijauan is a township in the Mukim Pulai, city of Iskandar Puteri, district of Johor Bahru, State of Johor Darul Ta'zim, Malaysia. The township is bordered by Bandar Baru Kangkar Pulai to the east, and Pulai Indah to the south. The rest area on it perimeter is covered in green. This township is being developed by Huayang Berhad since 2015, and ready for occupation from 2017 onward.

See also
Pulai Mutiara, Johor
Pulai Indah, Johor
Kangkar Pulai
Iskandar Puteri

References

Iskandar Puteri
Townships in Johor